The Man and the Woman is a 1908 American silent short drama film directed by D. W. Griffith.

Cast
 George Gebhardt as Tom Wilkins
 Linda Arvidson as Gladys
 Charles Inslee as False Clergyman
 Harry Solter as Priest

References

External links
 

1908 films
1908 drama films
Silent American drama films
American silent short films
American black-and-white films
Films directed by D. W. Griffith
1908 short films
1900s American films